The 1972 Eastern Michigan Hurons football team represented Eastern Michigan University as an independent during the 1972 NCAA College Division football season. In their sixth season under head coach Dan Boisture, the Hurons compiled a 6–4 record and outscored their opponents, 202 to 162. The team opened the season losing three of its first four games but ended the season with a 5–1 record in the final six games, including a 28–3 victory over Central Michigan.

Schedule

References

Eastern Michigan
Eastern Michigan Eagles football seasons
Eastern Michigan Hurons football